The 2006 Anzac Test was a rugby league test match played between Australia and New Zealand at Suncorp Stadium in Brisbane on 5 May 2006. It was the 7th Anzac test played between the two nations since the first was played under the Super League banner in 1997 and the second to be played in Brisbane. It marked the farewell appearance from representative football for Australian rugby league Immortal Andrew Johns and his only appearance alongside future immortal Jonathon Thurston who came off the bench and played five eighth after an injury to fullback Karmichael Hunt caused starting five eight Darren Lockyer to shift to the back.

Teams

Match summary

References

2006 in Australian rugby league
2006 in New Zealand rugby league
Anzac Test
Rugby league in Brisbane
International rugby league competitions hosted by Australia